The 1975 Jordanian  League (known as The Jordanian  League,   was the 25th season of Jordan  League since its inception in 1944. In the 1975 it was called (first division league) Al-Ahli won its 6th title,  ended Al-Faisaly monopoly on the title of the championship, which lasted from 1959 to 1974.

Teams

Map

League table

Overview
Al-Ahli won the championship.

References
RSSSF

External links
 Jordan Football Association website

Jordanian Pro League seasons
Jordan
Jordan
football